Len Jarvis (1884 - unknown) was an English footballer who played as a wing-half for West Ham United and Bury.

Footballing career
Jarvis was signed by manager Syd King for West Ham and made his debut in April 1904 against New Brompton. Little is known of his match-by-match career but he gained attention and press coverage for his foul on Alf Dean of local rivals, Millwall. In a game on 13 October 1906, played at Millwall's North Greenwich ground, Jarvis smashed Dean against a metal advertising hoarding such that Dean was unable to continue playing. His action was investigated by the Football Association and he was banned from playing for fourteen days.

After 140 games for West Ham and five goals he moved to Bury in 1909.

References

1884 births
English footballers
Association football midfielders
West Ham United F.C. players
Bury F.C. players
People from Grays, Essex
Date of death unknown
Place of death missing